The Kigali Amendment to the Montreal Protocol is an international agreement to gradually reduce the consumption and production of hydrofluorocarbons (HFCs). It is a legally binding agreement designed to create rights and obligations in international law.

The Montreal Protocol was originally created to preserve and restore the ozone layer; participating countries agreed to phase out chlorofluorocarbons (CFCs), gases that had been causing ozone depletion. HFCs do not contain chlorine, so they do not cause ozone depletion, and therefore have been replacing CFCs under the Protocol. However, HFCs are powerful greenhouse gases that contribute to climate change, so this amendment adds HFCs to the list of chemicals that countries promise to phase down.

As of February 26, 2023, 148 states and the European Union have ratified the Kigali Amendment.

Background 
Many industrial products, including refrigerants and other cooling services, use HFCs.

Originally, chlorofluorocarbons (CFCs) were used in these applications, but the deleterious effect of these gases on the ozone layer was revealed in 1974 by Paul J. Crutzen, Mario Molina, and F. Sherwood Rowland. The Montreal Protocol was signed in 1987 by the 20 major CFC producers and came into effect in 1989; since 1987, all 197 member states of the United Nations, among others, have ratified the Protocol. HFCs have since largely replaced CFCs.

Although HFCs are harmless to the ozone layer, they are potent greenhouse gases. While their lifespan in the atmosphere is short (10 to 20 years) relative to carbon dioxide, HFCs filter infrared waves much more powerfully. Eliminating emissions of these gases could significantly lower the effects of global warming and avoid a full 0.5 degree Celsius of warming above preindustrial levels by the end of the century.

Details of the amendment 
Article 5 of the Montreal Protocol created separate standards for developing countries and non-developing. Whether a country was categorized as developing or non-developing depended on individual economic conditions at the time of the agreement or pending special request. Because the Protocol was created in the 1980s and countries economic situations have changed, the Kigali Amendment created three updated groups for compliance with the additional terms.

The first group, which includes the "old" industrialized countries, is committed to reducing the use of HFCs by 45% by 2024 and by 85% by 2036, compared to their use between 2011 and 2013. A second group, which includes China and Brazil, is committed to reducing its consumption by 80% by 2045. Finally, this deadline is extended to 2047 for the rest of the countries, including India and a number of countries in the Middle East, which are large consumers of air conditioning.

In addition, parties that experience monthly average temperatures over 35 degrees Celsius for at least two months per year, over a period of 10 consecutive years, may request a waiver.

Reception to the amendment 
Environmentalist website TreeHugger urged then-President of the United States Donald Trump to ask the United States Senate to ratify the amendment.

Adoption of the amendment

Notes

References 

Environmental treaties
Treaties concluded in 2016
2016 in the environment
Kigali